Master Gardener is a 2022 American independent crime thriller film written and directed by Paul Schrader and starring Joel Edgerton, Sigourney Weaver, and Quintessa Swindell. The film had its world premiere at the 79th Venice International Film Festival on September 3, 2022.

Premise
Narvel Roth is the meticulous horticulturist of Gracewood Gardens, a beautiful estate owned by wealthy dowager Mrs. Haverhill. When she orders Roth to take on her troubled great-niece Maya as his apprentice, his life is thrown into chaos and dark secrets from his past emerge.

Cast
Joel Edgerton as Narvel Roth
Sigourney Weaver as Mrs. Haverhill
Quintessa Swindell as Maya
Esai Morales

Production
It was announced in September 2021 that Joel Edgerton and Sigourney Weaver had been cast in the film, written and directed by Paul Schrader. Filming began in Louisiana on February 3, 2022, and was scheduled to take place in the St. Francisville area through early March. On February 8, it was announced that two more actors joined the cast, Quintessa Swindell (replacing Zendaya, whom Schrader originally had in mind), and Esai Morales.

Release 
Master Gardener had its world premiere at the 79th Venice International Film Festival on September 3, 2022.

Reception 
On the review aggregator website Rotten Tomatoes, the film has an approval rating of 66%, based on 29 reviews, and an average rating of 6.7/10.

References

External links

2022 crime thriller films
2022 independent films
2020s American films
2020s English-language films
American crime thriller films
American independent films
Films directed by Paul Schrader
Films with screenplays by Paul Schrader
Films shot in Louisiana
Works about gardening